Log area ratios (LAR) can be used to represent reflection coefficients (another form for linear prediction coefficients) for transmission over a channel. While not as efficient as line spectral pairs (LSPs), log area ratios are much simpler to compute. Let  be the kth reflection coefficient of a filter, the kth LAR is:

 

Use of Log Area Ratios have now been mostly replaced by Line Spectral Pairs, but older codecs, such as GSM-FR use LARs.

See also
 Line spectral pairs

Lossy compression algorithms